Big Branch is a stream in Monroe County in the U.S. state of Missouri. It is a tributary of the Middle Fork Salt River.

Despite its name, Big Branch is relatively smaller than other nearby streams.

See also
List of rivers of Missouri

References

Rivers of Monroe County, Missouri
Rivers of Missouri